The FTSE 350 Index is a market capitalization weighted stock market index made up of the constituents of the FTSE 100 and FTSE 250 indices. The FTSE 100 Index comprises the largest 100 companies by capitalization which have their primary listing on the London Stock Exchange, while the FTSE 250 Index comprises mid-capitalized companies  not covered by the FTSE 100, i.e. the 101st to 350th largest. See the articles about those indices for lists of the constituents of the FTSE 350.

The index is maintained by FTSE Russell, a subsidiary of the London Stock Exchange Group.

References

External links
 FTSE 350 Index on Yahoo Finance

FTSE Group stock market indices
British stock market indices